McCready is an Irish and Scottish surname. It is the Anglicized form of Gaelic Mac Riada "son of Riada", a personal name meaning "trained" and "expert". McCready is a variant of McCreadie; other variants are MacCready and McCredie.

People with the surname include:

 Allan McCready (1916–2003), New Zealand politician
 Benjamin McCready (born 1951), American portrait painter
 Chris McCready (born 1981), English footballer
 Connie McCready (1921–2000), American politician
 Esther McCready (1931–2020), American nurse
 George McCready Price (1870–1963), Canadian creationist 
 Keith McCready (born 1957), American professional pool player
 Kevin F. McCready (1957–2004), American clinical psychologist 
 Lauren S. McCready (1915–2007), Rear Admiral and founder of the United States Merchant Marine Academy
 Mike McCready (born 1966), lead guitarist of the American rock band, Pearl Jam.
 Mindy McCready (1975–2013), American country music artist
 Niall McCready, Irish Gaelic footballer
 Pat McCready (born 1974), Canadian lacrosse player 
 Scott McCready (born 1977), British football (American) player
 Sam McCready (disambiguation), several people

See also
 Gwyn Cready (born 1962), American author

References